The Sexy Hot Awards (in Brazilian: Prêmio Sexy Hot) are pornographic film awards in Brazil.

Structure
The Sexy Hot Awards are sponsored and presented by the Brazilian adult cable channel Sexy Hot, and are meant to "encourage and recognize the work" of actors, actresses, producers and directors in Brazil's pornographic industry.

Formerly called PIP (Prêmio da Industria Pornô), the ceremony came to be called the Prêmio Sexy Hot 
from its 2nd edition.

In order to ensure impartiality, some  winners are named by popular vote on the internet, whole others  by a technical jury. On the 3rd edition Xico Sá, Clara Aguillar and David Cardoso won Best Director, Best Title, Best Lesbian, and Best Trans Scene for their films. On the 4th edition, the jury was composed by Stanlay Miranda, Mariana Baltar, Rafinha Bastos, and Paulo Cursino.

Winners

See also 

 AVN Award

Notes and references

External links
 

Awards established in 2014
Pornographic film awards
Brazilian pornography